United Nations Security Council Resolution 48, adopted on April 23, 1948, called on all concerned parties to comply with United Nations Security Council Resolution 46 and to that end established a Truce Commission for Palestine to assist the Security Council in implementing the truce.

The resolution was approved by eight votes to none, with three abstentions from Colombia, the Ukrainian SSR and the Soviet Union.

See also
List of United Nations Security Council Resolutions 1 to 100 (1946–1953)
United Nations Security Council Resolution 49
United Nations Security Council Resolution 50

References
Text of the Resolution at undocs.org

External links
 

 0048
 0048
Mandatory Palestine
1948 Arab–Israeli War
April 1948 events